The fourth season of the American teen drama television series Gossip Girl premiered on The CW on September 13, 2010, and concluded on May 16, 2011, consisting of 22 episodes. Based on the novel series of the same name by Cecily von Ziegesar, the series was developed for television by Josh Schwartz and Stephanie Savage. The CW renewed the series for a full fourth season on February 16, 2010. Blake Lively, Leighton Meester, Penn Badgley, Chace Crawford, Taylor Momsen, Ed Westwick, Jessica Szohr, Kelly Rutherford, and Matthew Settle all return as series regulars.

It was later announced that the show would stay in its Monday 9:00 p.m. timeslot as a lead-out to 90210. The season premiered on September 13, 2010, to a 1.0 Adults 18–49 rating and 1.84 million viewers. The fourth episode achieved a 1.1 Adults 18–49 rating, the season's highest-rated episode, while episode 11 was the most watched with 2.06 million viewers tuning in. The season concluded on May 16, 2011, with 1.36 million live viewers tuning in. On Metacritic, the season has a 75 out of 100 rating, indicating generally positive reviews by critics.

Synopsis
Blair and Chuck try to end their on/off again relationship, but their plans are thrown for a curve when new international love interests for both come into the picture. Dan becomes a father when Georgina Sparks leaves her son Milo with him. Blair and Serena begin at Columbia but face challenges at their new school. Nate begins dating Juliet Sharp, who has a mysterious vendetta against Serena and Lily. Lily tries to sell Bass Industries, but the Bass family is in for a loop when an old enemy, Russell Thorpe and his daughter Raina come to town.Serena lands in legal trouble for something Lily did years earlier. Serena and Eric's secret cousin, Charlie Rhodes comes to Manhattan; but is she who she says she is?

Cast and characters

Main cast
 Blake Lively as Serena van der Woodsen
 Leighton Meester as Blair Waldorf
 Penn Badgley as Dan Humphrey
 Chace Crawford as Nate Archibald
 Taylor Momsen as Jenny Humphrey
 Ed Westwick as Chuck Bass
 Jessica Szohr as Vanessa Abrams
 Kelly Rutherford as Lily Humphrey
 Matthew Settle as Rufus Humphrey
 Kristen Bell as Gossip Girl (uncredited)

Recurring cast
 Hugo Becker as Prince Louis Grimaldi
 Katie Cassidy as Juliet Sharp
 Margaret Colin as Eleanor Waldorf
 Michelle Trachtenberg as Georgina Sparks
 David Call as Ben Donovan
 Connor Paolo as Eric van der Woodsen
 Amanda Setton as Penelope Shafai
 Zuzanna Szadkowski as Dorota Kishlovsky
 Alice Callahan as Jessica Leitenberg
 Sam Page as Colin Forrester
 Sam Robards as Howard Archibald
 Aaron Schwartz as Vanya
 Francie Swift as Anne Archibald
 Kevin Zegers as Damien Dalgaard
 Michael Boatman as Russell Thorpe
 Tika Sumpter as Raina Thorpe
 William Baldwin as William van der Woodsen
 Kaylee DeFer as Ivy Dickens/Charlie Rhodes
 Nicole Fiscella as Isabel Coates
 Nan Zhang as Kati Farkas
 Melissa Fumero as Zoe

Guest cast
 Clémence Poésy as Eva Coupeau
 Jayne Atkinson as Dean Reuther
 Marlyne Barrett as Martha Chamberlain
 Tim Gunn as himself
 Robyn as herself
 Luke Kleintank as Elliot Garfield
 Caitlin FitzGerald as Epperly Lawrence
 Florence and the Machine as themselves
 Sheila Kelley as Carol Rhodes
 Caroline Lagerfelt as CeCe Rhodes
 Joanne Whalley as Princess Sophie Grimaldi
 Desmond Harrington as Jack Bass
 Wallace Shawn as Cyrus Rose
 Jan Maxwell as Headmistress Queller

Episodes

Production
The series was renewed for a fourth season on February 16, 2010. It continued to air Mondays at 9/8c following 90210, and premiered on September 13, 2010.

Blake Lively, Leighton Meester, Ed Westwick, and Clémence Poésy began filming this season in Paris on July 5, 2010. It was announced that Jessica Szohr would be absent for an unspecified number of episodes. However, Szohr began filming on July 9, 2010, the first day of production in New York City along with Penn Badgley, which indicated she would be back sooner than anticipated. Szohr appeared in the season premiere. Taylor Momsen began filming her scenes on August 30, 2010. Taylor Momsen appears in one episode titled "Easy J" which aired October 25, 2010, and will return in full series regular status for the second half of the season. It had also been confirmed that Tate Donovan, who previously worked with show's developers Josh Schwartz and Stephanie Savage in The O.C., would be directing an episode scheduled to air in November 2010.

The first two episodes of the season take place in Paris.

The Airborne Toxic Event made a special appearance during the season 4 finale "The Wrong Goodbye" as the band for the Constance Billard Alumni party, playing the song "Changing" from their second album, All at Once.

Cast
 Harry Potter actress Clémence Poésy joined the cast in Paris as Chuck's new girlfriend, Eva, for four episodes. 

Former Melrose Place star Katie Cassidy joined the cast as Juliet, a student at Columbia University and a potential love interest for Nate, with an agenda against Serena, together with David Call as Ben Donovan, Juliet's imprisoned brother. Actor Sam Page was cast as Serena's new love interest, a Columbia business professor and Juliet and Ben's cousin, for a four-episode arc. Kevin Zegers returned to the show as Damien Dalgaard, appearing in five episodes. Desmond Harrington also returned as Chuck's uncle, Jack Bass. Taylor Momsen was absent for several episodes at the beginning of the season due to her touring commitments with The Pretty Reckless, but returned near the end of the first half of the season. She was then scheduled for an indefinite hiatus from the show and only appeared in four episodes of the season. Michael Boatman and Tika Sumpter guest-starred in episodes airing in 2011. Boatman played Russell Thorpe, a powerful business tycoon and a former associate of Chuck's father, Bart, while Sumpter portrayed his daughter, Raina.

Tim Gunn and fashion designers Diane Von Furstenberg and Rachel Zoe all made special cameo appearances during the first half of the season. Singer Robyn also made a cameo appearance performing her song "Hang with Me".

William Baldwin admitted he would like to return for the fourth season. He said he would return in the same capacity of Michelle Trachtenberg to come in cause some trouble then leave again. The CW announced in December 2010 that Baldwin would return in February 2011. Sheila Kelley replaced Illeana Douglas as Lily's sister, Carol, after Douglas was forced to drop out of the project due to scheduling conflicts. Michelle Trachtenberg returned to the series as Georgina Sparks in the season finale. Kaylee DeFer also joined the cast as Carol's daughter and Serena and Eric's cousin, Charlie Rhodes. DeFer had originally auditioned for the role of Raina. DeFer's contract with the show also included the possibility of her becoming a series regular next season. DeFer was officially promoted to series regular starting in season 5.

Hugo Becker, who played Prince Louis Grimaldi, returned on April 18, 2011, for the rest of the season. The Borgias actress Joanne Whalley had been cast in an episode of Gossip Girl following a Screen Actors Guild casting notice. Whalley was rumoured to play an adversarial role to Kelly Rutherford's Lily van der Woodsen, but turned out to be that of Princess Sophie, Louis Grimaldi's mother.

Academy Award-nominated director David O. Russell made a cameo. On April 6, 2011, it was reported that 10 Things I Hate About You star Ethan Peck had landed a role in the show. Both stars were seen filming with Lively in California. Peck would reportedly make his debut in the season finale and was in talks with producers for a recurring role for the fifth season. Recurring cast members Nan Zhang and Nicole Fiscella reprised their roles as Kati Farkas and Isabel Coates for the penultimate episode and the season finale. Zhang had left the show during the first season and Fiscella finished her stint as a recurring cast member during the second season of the show. Tony Award-winning actress Jan Maxwell reprised her role as Headmistress Queller for the season finale. Becker remained ambiguous on whether he would be joining the series as a recurring or regular cast member during an interview with Zap2it, stating "the answer is in the finale." On May 16, 2011, Entertainment Weekly announced that Gossip Girl author Cecily von Ziegesar would be making a cameo for the season finale.

Plot
 Season four begins with Serena and Blair enjoying their summer in Paris, until the unexpected appearance of Chuck Bass, who is using a false name and cozying up to a new girl. Blair has to decide if she wants to fight for Chuck or spend her energy trying to rule Columbia University. Serena needs to choose between Nate and Dan, but Dan is a bit busy coping with his new role as "dad" to Georgina's baby. Georgina later reveals the baby is not his. Stephanie Savage revealed in an interview that the Dan and Serena story is "reactivated" and sorting through it will become a bigger story. She also revealed that the third-season finale "Last Tango, Then Paris" had a big impact on Jenny and she would be a changed person when she returns. Her return later this season would be "full of drama".

The Gossip Girl website was under construction when Serena and Blair returned from Paris and debuted "never before seen technology" when it returned. It is revealed that Juliet is working with her brother to take down Serena, for unknown reasons. Vanessa gets caught in the middle when Juliet sets her up for stealing Serena's phone and sending an incriminating email. Vanessa later leaves town when only Dan believes her, but tells Juliet to watch her back. After Blair ran Chuck's new girlfriend out of town, he pledges war against her. They later decide that it is best for both of them if they end their fighting after Jenny posts on Gossip Girl the reason why she left town. In the next episode, at Blair's 20th birthday party they kiss and have sex. Both Nate and Dan still have feelings for Serena, but do not know what to make of her mixed signals.

Most of Juliet's plan is revealed by the end of the first half of the season, with some elements set to carry over. Juliet also recruits two main characters to help take Serena down. Blair and Dan team up to help Serena. The two characters who joined Juliet were Vanessa and Jenny. The three manage to turn everyone against Serena when Juliet and Jenny dress up as her at a masquerade party. Juliet takes photos of herself with cocaine and drugs Serena, causing Lily to believe Serena had gone off the rails again and has her committed to the Ostroff center. Jenny, feeling guilty about what they have done, reveals everything to Blair. Vanessa leaves town to avoid Blair, while Blair and Dan form an alliance to seek revenge on Juliet. After they track her down, Juliet goes to Serena and explains everything to her. It is revealed in a confrontation with Lily that Juliet's brother Ben was Serena's former teacher at her boarding school in Connecticut, who was accused of having an affair with Serena. Lily forged Serena's signature on the police affidavit, which in Lily's plan, would allow Serena to return home and, inadvertently, had sent Ben to prison. Serena then hatches a plan to help free Ben from prison. This involves proving that her mother forged the affidavit against Ben. Chuck also learns that Lily was planning to sell Bass Industries behind his back.

Reception
The season opened to a 1.0 Adults 18–49 rating and 1.84 million viewers. The fourth episode initially hit season highs in all categories with a 2.8 Women 18-34 rating, 1.1 Adults 18–49, a 1.7 in Adults 18-34 and 2.00 million viewers, until the airing of the eleventh episode hit a season high in viewers 2.06 million. The series has larger increases in the adults 18–49 on the Live + 7 DVR Ratings. The 4th episode had an 18–49 rating of 1.1, which was later increased to a 1.5 rating. The 5th episode had an 18–49 rating of 0.9, which later rose up to 1.3, which is 44% of increase.

The season premiered to generally favorable reviews from critics. Steve Marsi of TV Fanatic gave the episode 4.5 stars out of 5.0 and praised Michelle Trachtenberg's and guest star Katie Cassidy's acting and storylines. Mark O. Estes, from TV Overmind, also enjoyed the fact that the episode had "explored more adult themes than usual." Gerard McGarry, from Unreality Shout, said that the season premiere was "brilliant", while Alexis James-blackhead, from Buzz Focus, said that the episode was "less sizzle than fizzle." Leighton Meester and Ed Westwick's performance was praised during the next episode "Chuck Bass" was also a trending topic on Twitter on the night the episode aired. The season has a 75/100 score of Metacritic, indicating mostly positive reviews.

Erik Adams from The A.V. Club reviewed the direction of the fourth season following the fourth-season premiere. "By the time a television show reaches its fourth season, the characteristics of its main ensemble ought to be deeply entrenched and immediately recognizable to regular viewers. But on the occasion of Gossip Girl's fourth season première, the ongoing teen soap—and its characters—are allowed some reinvention. The CW's flagship franchise is in a precarious position: it's a show that's both out of time and losing its sizzle." Adams cited the show's expensive art direction despite the economic woes outside of the show and the doubtful following of the Gossip Girl world considering the rise of micro-blogging in celebrity culture. Adams praised the development of Blair and Serena's relationship, declaring their friendship as "the great, central romance of Gossip Girl."

Brian Cantor of Headline Planet expressed disappointment with the show's performance for the season premiere, stating "[Gossip Girl] considerably [has] less critical interest and buzz than there had been for past seasons; the show no longer even has the 'pop culture phenomenon' claim to soften the blow of ratings releases." Judy Berman of the Los Angeles Times in contrast, defended the show's creative form during the midseason finale "The Townie", stating, "Whenever I start to think that the show has run out of material [...] it unleashes a showstopping hour of sparkly melodrama that reminds me of why I'm still watching." With the airing of the season finale TV Fanatics Steve Marsi assessed the fourth season stating that "it's not a stretch to say the past season was uneven at best, lacking some of the continuity, humor and drama of the past. It's hard to put one's finger on in a sense, since many episodes were enjoyable. But there was a certain OMG-can-you-believe-this-happened factor that just wasn't there."

DVD release

References

External links
 List of Gossip Girl season 4 episodes on IMDb

2010 American television seasons
2011 American television seasons